Gorgonia is a genus of soft corals, sea fans in the family Gorgoniidae.

Species
The World Register of Marine Species lists these species:

References 

Gorgoniidae
Octocorallia genera
Taxa named by Carl Linnaeus